The goal of this list is to comprehensively catalogue North Korea's current inventory of vehicles and equipment. In an effort to streamline the list and avoid unnecessary confusion, civilian trucks towing military trailers and military trucks on which missiles, rockets or radars are based are not included in the list. If several configurations of a vehicle with one designation are known, they are added as such. The part within apostrophes refers to an unoffical name, such as the US DoD M-xxxx designation system (referring to the first year the system was identified). When available, the range (of missiles) are added in square brackets. All vehicles listed are presumed to still be in use with the Korean People's Army.

North Korea’s Fighting Vehicles

Vehicles

Artillery

Anti-tank weapons

Anti-aircraft weapons

References

Military equipment of North Korea
North Korea
Korean People's Army Ground Force